へ, in hiragana, or ヘ in katakana, is one of the Japanese kana, which represents one mora. The  sound is the only sound that is written identically in hiragana and katakana. In the Sakhalin dialect of the Ainu language, ヘ can be written as small ㇸ to represent a final h after an e sound (エㇸ eh).

Stroke order

Other communicative representations

 Full Braille representation

 Computer encodings

References

Specific kana